Sunil Kumar Singh may refer to:

Sunil Kumar Singh (Bihar politician) (died 2020), Indian politician
Sunil Kumar Singh (Jharkhand politician) (born 1962), Indian politician
Sunil Kumar Singh (geochemist) (born 1971), Indian geochemist